The total fertility rate (TFR) of a population is the average number of children that would be born to a woman over her lifetime if:
 she were to experience the exact current age-specific fertility rates (ASFRs) through her lifetime
 she were to live from birth until the end of her reproductive life.

It is obtained by summing the single-year age-specific rates at a given time. As of 2023, the total fertility rate varied widely across the world, from 0.78 in South Korea to 6.82 in Niger.

Fertility tends to be correlated with levels of economic development. Historically, developed countries have significantly lower fertility rates, generally correlated with greater wealth, education, urbanization, and other factors. Conversely, in least developed countries, fertility rates tend to be higher. Families desire children for their labor and as caregivers for their parents in old age. Fertility rates are also higher due to the lack of access to contraceptives, stricter adherence to religious beliefs, generally lower levels of female education, and lower rates of female employment.

As of 2020, the total fertility rate for the world is 2.3.  Global TFR has declined rapidly since the 1960s, and some forecasters like Sanjeev Sanyal argue that the effective global fertility rate will fall below global replacement rate, estimated to be 2.3, in the 2020s. This would stabilize world population sometime during the period 2050–2070. This differs from projections by the United Nations which predict some growth in world population will continue up to 2100. Taken together, these projections indicate that the human population will achieve zero growth sometime in the second half of this century.

Parameter characteristics
The TFR is not based on the fertility of any real group of women since this would involve waiting until they had completed childbearing. Nor is it based on counting up the total number of children actually born over their lifetime. Instead, the TFR is based on the age-specific fertility rates of women in their "child-bearing years", which in conventional international statistical usage is ages 15–44.

The TFR is, therefore, a measure of the fertility of an imaginary woman who passes through her reproductive life subject to all the age-specific fertility rates for ages 15–49 that were recorded for a given population in a given year. The TFR represents the average number of children a woman would potentially have, were she to fast-forward through all her childbearing years in a single year, under all the age-specific fertility rates for that year. In other words, this rate is the number of children a woman would have if she was subject to prevailing fertility rates at all ages from a single given year and survives throughout all her childbearing years.

Related parameters

Net reproduction rate
An alternative fertility measure is the net reproduction rate (NRR), which measures the number of daughters a woman would have in her lifetime if she were subject to prevailing age-specific fertility and mortality rates in the given year. When the NRR is exactly 1, then each generation of women is exactly reproducing itself.

The NRR is less widely used than the TFR, and the United Nations stopped reporting NRR data for member nations after 1998. But the NRR is particularly relevant where the number of male babies born is very high due to gender imbalance and sex selection. This is a significant factor in world population, due to the high level of gender imbalance in the very populous nations of China and India. The gross reproduction rate (GRR), is the same as the NRR, except that—like the TFR—it ignores life expectancy.

Total period fertility rate
The TFR (or TPFR—total period fertility rate) is a better index of fertility than the crude birth rate (annual number of births per thousand population) because it is independent of the age structure of the population, but it is a poorer estimate of actual completed family size than the total cohort fertility rate, which is obtained by summing the age-specific fertility rates that actually applied to each cohort as they aged through time. In particular, the TFR does not necessarily predict how many children young women now will eventually have, as their fertility rates in years to come may change from those of older women now. However, the TFR is a reasonable summary of current fertility levels.
TFR and long term population growth rate, g, are closely related. For a population structure in a steady state, growth rate equals log(TFR/2)/Xm, where Xm is the mean age for childbearing women.

Tempo effect

The TPFR (total period fertility rate) is affected by a tempo effect—if age of childbearing increases (and life cycle fertility is unchanged) then while the age of childbearing is increasing, TPFR will be lower (because the births are occurring later), and then the age of childbearing stops increasing, the TPFR will increase (due to the deferred births occurring in the later period) even though the life cycle fertility has been unchanged. In other words, the TPFR is a misleading measure of life cycle fertility when childbearing age is changing, due to this statistical artifact. This is a significant factor in some countries, such as the Czech Republic and Spain in the 1990s. Some measures seek to adjust for this timing effect to gain a better measure of life-cycle fertility.

Replacement rates 

Replacement fertility is the total fertility rate at which women give birth to enough babies to sustain population levels, assuming that mortality rates remain constant and net migration is zero. If replacement level fertility is sustained over a sufficiently long period, each generation will exactly replace itself. The replacement fertility rate is 2.1 births per woman for most developed countries (2.1 in the UK, for example), but can be as high as 3.5 in undeveloped countries because of higher mortality rates, especially child mortality. The global average for the replacement total fertility rate (eventually leading to a stable global population) for the contemporary period (2010-2015) is 2.3 children per woman.

Lowest-low fertility
The term "lowest-low fertility" is defined as TFR at or below 1.3. Lowest low fertility is found almost exclusively within East Asian countries. The East Asian American community in the United States also exhibits lowest-low fertility. At one point in the late 20th century and early 21st century this was also observed in Eastern and Southern Europe, however, since then, the fertility rate has risen in most countries of Europe.

The lowest TFR recorded anywhere in the world in recorded history is for Xiangyang district of Jiamusi city (Heilongjiang, China) which had a TFR of 0.41. Outside China, the lowest TFR ever recorded was 0.80 for Eastern Germany in 1994. The low Eastern German value was influenced by a change to higher age at birth, with the consequence that neither older cohorts (e.g. women born until the late 1960s), who often already had children, nor younger cohorts, who were postponing childbirth, had many children during that time. The total cohort fertility rate of each age cohort of women in East Germany did not drop as significantly.

Population-lag effect

A population that maintained a TFR of 3.8 over an extended period without a correspondingly high death or emigration rate would increase rapidly (doubling period ~ 32 years), whereas a population that maintained a TFR of 2.0 over a long time would decrease, unless it had a large enough immigration. However, it may take several generations for a change in the total fertility rate to be reflected in birth rate, because the age distribution must reach equilibrium. For example, a population that has recently dropped below replacement-level fertility will continue to grow, because the recent high fertility produced large numbers of young couples who would now be in their childbearing years.

This phenomenon carries forward for several generations and is called population momentum, population inertia, or population-lag effect. This time-lag effect is of great importance to the growth rates of human populations.

TFR (net) and long-term population growth rate, g, are closely related. For a population structure in a steady state and with zero migration, g equals log(TFR/2)/Xm, where Xm is mean age for childbearing women and thus P(t) = P(0)exp(gt). At the left side is shown the empirical relation between the two variables in a cross-section of countries with the most recent y-y growth rate. The parameter 1/b should be an estimate of the Xm; here equal to 1/0.02 = 50 years, way off the mark because of population momentum. E.g. for log(TFR/2) = 0, g should be exactly zero, which is seen not to be the case.

Factors affecting total fertility rate

Fertility factors are determinants of the number of children that an individual is likely to have. Fertility factors are mostly positive or negative correlations without certain causations.

Factors generally associated with increased fertility include the intention to have children, very high level of gender equality, religiosity, inter-generational transmission of values, marriage and cohabitation, maternal and social support, rural residence, pro family government programs, low IQ and increased food production.

Factors generally associated with decreased fertility include rising income, value and attitude changes, education, female labor participation, population control, age, contraception, partner reluctance to having children, a low level of gender equality, and infertility.The effect of all these factors can be summarized with a plot of Total Fertility Rate against Human Development Index (HDI) for a sample of countries. The chart shows that the two factors are inversely correlated, that is, in general, the lower a country’s HDI the higher its fertility.

Another common way of summarizing the relationship between economic development and fertility is a plot of TFR against Per Capita GDP, a proxy for standard of living. This chart shows that Per Capita GDP is also inversely correlated with fertility.

The impact of human development on TFR can best be summarized by a quote from Karan Singh, a former minister of population in India.  At a 1974 United Nations population conference in Bucharest, he said "Development is the best contraceptive."

Wealthy countries, those with high per capita GDP, usually have a lower fertility rate than poor countries, those with low per capita GDP. This may seem counter-intuitive. The inverse relationship between income and fertility has been termed a demographic-economic paradox because evolutionary biology suggests that greater means should enable the production of more offspring, not fewer.

Many of these factors, however, are not universal, and differ by region and social class. For instance, at a global level, religion is correlated with increased fertility, but in the West less so: Scandinavian countries and France are among the least religious in the EU, but have the highest TFR, while the opposite is true about Portugal, Greece, Cyprus, Poland and Spain.

National efforts to increase or decrease fertility
Governments have often set population targets, to either increase or decrease the total fertility rate; or to have certain ethnic or socioeconomic groups have a lower or higher fertility rate. Often such policies have been interventionist, and abusive. The most notorious natalist policies of the 20th century include those in communist Romania and communist Albania, under Nicolae Ceaușescu and Enver Hoxha respectively. The policy of Romania (1967–1990) was very aggressive, including outlawing abortion and contraception, routine pregnancy tests for women, taxes on childlessness, and legal discrimination against childless people; and resulted in large numbers of children put into Romanian orphanages by parents who couldn't cope with raising them, street children in the 1990s (when many orphanages were closed and the children ended up on the streets), overcrowding in homes and schools, and over 9,000 women who died due to illegal abortions. Conversely, in China the government sought to lower the fertility rate, and, as such, enacted the one-child policy (1978–2015), which included abuses such as forced abortions.

Some governments have sought to regulate which groups of society could reproduce through eugenic policies of forced sterilizations of 'undesirable' population groups. Such policies were carried out against ethnic minorities in Europe and North America in the first half of the 20th century, and more recently in Latin America against the Indigenous population in the 1990s; in Peru, former President Alberto Fujimori has been accused of genocide and crimes against humanity as a result of a sterilization program put in place by his administration targeting indigenous people (mainly the Quechua and Aymara people). Within these historical contexts, the notion of reproductive rights has developed. Such rights are based on the concept that each person freely decides if, when, and how many children to have - not the state or church. According to the OHCHR, reproductive rights "rest on the recognition of the basic rights of all couples and individuals to decide freely and responsibly the number, spacing and timing of their children and to have the information and means to do so, and the right to attain the highest standard of sexual and reproductive health. It also includes the right to make decisions concerning reproduction free of discrimination, coercion and violence, as expressed in human rights documents".

History of total fertility rate and projections for the future 
From around 10,000 BC to the beginning of the Industrial Revolution fertility rates around the world were high by today's standards, but the onset of the Industrial Revolution, around 1800, brought about what has come to be called the Demographic Transition, and TFR began a long-term decline in almost every region of the world, a decline that continues to this day.

Before 1800 
Because all nations before the Industrial Revolution were caught in what is now labeled the "Malthusian Trap", improvements in standards of living could only be achieved by reductions in population growth through either increases in mortality rates (via wars, plagues, famines, etc) or reductions in birth rates. However, at the same time, other realities such as child mortality, that could reach 50%, and the need to produce workers, male heirs, and old-age care givers required fertility rates to be high by today’s standards.

For example, fertility rates in Europe in the years before 1800 ranged from 4.5 (Scandinavia) to 6.2 (Belgium). The Total Fertility Rate in the United States in 1800 was 7.0. Fertility rates in Asia during this period were similar to those in Europe. In spite of these high fertility rates, global population growth was still very slow, about 0.04% per year, mostly due to high mortality rates and the equally slow growth in the production of food.

1800 to 1950 
After 1800 the Industrial Revolution got underway in some countries, particularly Great Britain, other countries in Europe, and the United States, and they underwent the beginnings of what is now called the Demographic Transition. Stage two of this process fueled a steady reduction in mortality rates due to, for example, improvements in public sanitation, personal hygiene and the food supply (that, for example, reduced the number of famines).

These reductions in mortality rates, particularly reductions in child mortality that increased the fraction of children surviving, plus other major societal changes such as urbanization, then led to stage three of the Demographic Transition and a reduction in fertility rates because there was simply no longer a need to birth so many children. 

The example from the US of the correlation between child mortality and the fertility rate is illustrative. In 1800 child mortality in the US was 33%. That is, one third of all children born would die before their fifth birthday. The Total Fertility Rate in 1800 was 7.0, meaning that the average woman would bear seven children during her lifetime. One hundred years later, in 1900, child mortality in the US had declined to 23%, a reduction of almost one third, and TFR had declined to 3.9, a reduction of 44%. By 1950, just fifty years later, child mortality had declined dramatically to 4%, a reduction of 84%, and TFR had declined to 3.2. By 2018 child mortality had declined further to 0.6% and TFR had declined further to 1.9, below replacement level.

1950 to the present and projections 

The table shows that after 1965 the Demographic Transition had spread around the world and global TFR began a long decline that continues to this day.

As of 2020, global TFR is 2.3. Because global fertility replacement rate for the contemporary period (2010–2015) has been estimated to be 2.3, humanity  has achieved or is approaching a significant milestone.

The chart shows that the decline in TFR since the 1960s has occurred in every region of the world and that the global TFR is projected to continue to decline for the remainder of this century.

Total fertility rate by region

The United Nations Population Division divides the world into six geographical regions. The table below shows the estimated TFR for each region.

Currently, the TFR of Europe, Latin America and the Caribbean, and Northern America are below the global replacement-level fertility rate of 2.1 children per woman.

Africa
This region has a TFR of 4.4, the highest in the world. Angola, Chad, DR Congo, Mali, and Niger have the highest TFR. The most populous country in Africa, Nigeria, had an estimated TFR of 4.7 in 2021. The second most populous country, Ethiopia, had an estimated TFR of 4.1 in 2021.

The poverty of the region, and the high maternal mortality and infant mortality had led to calls from WHO of family planning and encouragement of smaller families.

Asia

Eastern Asia

Hong Kong, Macau, Singapore, South Korea, and Taiwan have the lowest-low fertility, defined as TFR at or below 1.3, and are among the lowest in the world. Macau had a TFR below 1.0 in 2004. North Korea has the highest TFR in East Asia at 1.95.

China

The TFR of China was 1.15 in 2021. China implemented the one-child policy in 1979 as a drastic population planning measure to control the ever-growing population at the time. The policy was replaced with the two-child policy in 2015 and the three-child policy in 2021 as China's population is aging faster than almost any other country in modern history.

Japan

Japan had a TFR of 1.4 in 2021. Japan's population is rapidly aging due to both a long life expectancy and a low birth rate. The total population is shrinking, losing 430,000 in 2018 to a total of 126.4 million. Hong Kong and Singapore mitigate this through immigrant workers, but in Japan, a serious demographic imbalance has developed, partly due to limited immigration to Japan.

South Korea

In South Korea, a low birthrate is one of its most urgent socio-economic challenges. Rising housing expenses, shrinking job opportunities for younger generations, insufficient support to families with newborns either from the government or employers are among the major explanations for its crawling TFR, which fell to 0.92 in 2019. Koreans are yet to find viable solutions to make the birthrate rebound, even after trying out dozens of programs over a decade, including subsidizing rearing expenses, giving priorities for public rental housing to couples with multiple children, funding day care centers, reserving seats in public transportation for pregnant women, and so on.

In the past 20 years, South Korea has recorded some of the lowest fertility and marriage levels in the world. As of 2021, South Korea is the country with the world’s lowest total fertility rate at 0.81. The TFR of the capital Seoul was 0.63 in 2021.

Middle East
In 2019, the TFR of Turkey reached 1.88.

In the Iranian calendar year (March 2019 – March 2020), Iran's total fertility rate fell to 1.8.

Southern Asia

Bangladesh
The fertility rate fell from 6.9 during the years 1970–1975 to 2.0 in 2020, an interval of about 47 years, or a little more than one generation.

India
The Indian fertility rate has declined significantly over the early 21st century. The Indian TFR declined from 5.2 in 1971 to 2.2 in 2018.  According to recent surveys, the TFR in India has further declined to 2.0 in 2019-2020, marking the first time it has gone below replacement level.

Europe

The average total fertility rate in the European Union (EU-27) is calculated at 1.55 children per woman in 2018. France had the highest TFR in 2018 among EU countries at 1.88, followed by Romania and Sweden (1.76), Ireland (1.75) and Denmark (1.73). Malta had the lowest TFR in 2018 among the EU countries at 1.23. Other southern European countries also had very low TFR (Portugal 1.38, Cyprus, 1.32, Greece 1.35, Spain 1.26, and Italy 1.29).  The United Kingdom had a TFR of 1.53 in 2021. According to 2021 estimates for the non-EU European post-Soviet states group, Russia had a TFR of 1.61, Moldova 1.57, Ukraine 1.55, and Belarus 1.49. Bosnia and Herzegovina had the lowest estimated TFR in Europe in 2018, at 1.31.

Emigration of young adults from Eastern Europe to the West aggravates the demographic problems of those countries. People from countries such as Bulgaria, Moldova, Romania, and Ukraine are particularly moving abroad.

Latin America and the Caribbean
The TFR of Brazil, the most populous country in the region, was estimated at 1.73 in 2021. The second most populous country, Mexico, had an estimated TFR of 2.17. The next most populous four countries in the region had estimated TFRs of between 1.9 and 2.3 in 2018, including Colombia (2.14), Argentina (2.2), Peru (2.0), and Venezuela (2.2). Guatemala had the highest estimated TFR in the region at 2.7 in 2018; and Puerto Rico the lowest at 1.21.

Northern America

Canada
The TFR of Canada was 1.4 in 2020.

United States

The total fertility rate in the United States after World War II peaked at about 3.8 children per woman in the late 1950s, dropped to below replacement in the early 70s, and by 1999 was at 2 children. Currently, the fertility is below replacement among those native born, and above replacement among immigrant families, most of whom come to the United States from countries with higher fertility. However, the fertility rate of immigrants to the United States has been found to decrease sharply in the second generation, correlating with improved education and income. In 2021, U.S. TFR was 1.84, ranging between over 2 in some states and under 1.6 in others.

See also
 Birth rate
 Fertility and intelligence
 Income and fertility
 List of countries by past fertility rate
 List of sovereign states and dependencies by total fertility rate
 Sub-replacement fertility
 Zero population growth

References

Further reading

External links
 CIA World Factbook - Total Fertility Rate by country
 eurostat - Your key to European statistics
 Population Reference Bureau Glossary of Population Terms
 Java Simulation of Total Fertility.
 Java Simulation of Population Dynamics.
 How Fertility Changes Across Immigrant Generations.
 Fertility Trends, Marriage Patterns and Savant Typologies.
 Human Fertility Database: Collection of age specific fertility rates for some developed countries.

Human overpopulation
Fertility
Rates